Topmaking mills make wool top, a semi-processed product from raw wool. The process requires that the wool be scoured (washed) and combed and sorted. The longer fibers resulting from the process are called tops, and are in a form ready for spinning. To be closer to customers, much of the industry has moved from Australia, Europe and the US to China. Many British companies produce high quality wool top in Britain from British wool and fibre; most work with the fleece from cleaning it to hand dying.

A topmaker is an old term for a person engaged in the process.

Spinning
Wool industry